Wallington High School for Girls is an all-girls selective grammar school in the London Borough of Sutton, England, specialising in STEM subjects and Languages.

Admissions
It is a grammar school, with Richard Booth as the Headmaster since September 2016. The school is also twinned with Wallington County Grammar School for Boys, in many events due to both the schools being in the same area as each other. Girls can join the boys' school's sixth form. Around 2000 girls each year apply for 210 available places.

The school is in Woodcote Green on the A237, around a half-mile north of the A2022 crossroads, at the junction of Sandy Lane South, Woodmansterne Lane, and Woodcote Road (A237). It is near the southern edge of the borough of Sutton, and the western edge of Croydon. It is only one mile north-east of Surrey, specifically Woodmansterne.

History 
Wallington High School for Girls was established in 1888 by a collective of nuns. The school building has since changed many times, and now accommodates an estimated 2310 students with 210 in each year group, as well as a Sixth Form College.

It was originally on Stanley Park Road in Carshalton, known as Wallington County Grammar School for Girls, the Wallington County School for Girls, Wallington County School, or the County School for Girls, Wallington. This site is now Bandon Hill primary school.

It moved to Woodcote Road in 1965, the same year it changed its administration from Surrey County Council to the borough of Sutton. In the late 1970s it had around 750 girls with 150 in the sixth form. In the 1990s it became grant-maintained school.

Headteachers
 Agnes Mark (1928–2005) from 1964 to 1980, later Head of Croydon High School from 1980 to 1990
 Amy Bull CBE (1902–1982) from 1937 to 1964, President from 1960 to 1962 of the Association of Headmistresses
Dr Dorothy Atkinson
Miss Margaret Edwards
Barbara Greatorex BSc
Jane Burton BSc
Richard Booth

Church
Although the school itself is non-religious, Springfield Church uses the school premises for its worship every Sunday at 10.30. The school lies in the parish of Wallington Holy Trinity, with the nearest church being Wallington St Patrick, and lies on the boundary with Roundshaw.

The Houses
Wallington has seven different forms in each year group. Each form is a member of one of the seven different houses, each named after an influential woman. Each house has two Year 11 House Captains, who are responsible for organising the annual fete and events and activities for their house. An extra house was added at the start of the academic year of 2012/2013 and this new house is called Curie with the house colour of Cerise. This is due to the school needing to expand in order to accommodate the growing number of primary school students leaving primary education without a place in a secondary school.

Uniform and house names
The school uniform consists of a navy and green kilt; a baby blue shirt (these may be short or long sleeved);a green v-neck jumper or cardigan and a navy blazer. However, students that joined the school before 2006 will not have blazers as these items were not on the school uniform regulations as of that time. Blazers also have the school logo and house name on the left-breast pocket. Socks are to be white, black or navy and ankle, knee-high or over-knee in length. Navy, black or beige tights (plain knit only). No socks to be worn over tights.

 Athena (Blue): named after the Greek goddess Athena.
 Seacole (Green): named after Mary Seacole.
 Brontë (Orange): named after Charlotte Brontë & Emily Brontë & Anne Brontë.
 Johnson (Red): named after Amy Johnson.
 Sharman (Purple): named after Helen Sharman.
 Pankhurst (Yellow): named after Emmeline Pankhurst.
 Curie (Cerise): named after Marie Curie.

Notable former pupils

 A. L. Barker, author
 Emily Benn, the Labour Party's youngest ever parliamentary candidate
 Deborah Bosley, travel writer, partner of Richard Ingrams in the 1990s
 Pauline Boty, artist and actress, 1938–66.
 Karen Bridge, badminton player, competed at the 1978 Commonwealth Games
Marjorie Doggett (1921–2010), Singaporean animal rights advocate, architectural photographer and heritage conservationist.
 Linda Lennon (nee Smith) CBE, Chief Executive since 2015 of the London Stadium, from 2012 to 2015 of The Royal Parks, and from 2009 to 2012 of the Parole Board for England and Wales
 Shelley Newman (nee Drew), discus thrower, won bronze at the 2002 Manchester Commonwealth Games
 Lucy Porter, comedian, attended the school from 1984 to 1991
 Katie Pratt, artist
 Rebecca Romero MBE, rower and cyclist, silver medal winner in the quadruple sculls at the 2004 Summer Olympics, and gold medal winner in the individual pursuit at the 2008 Olympics, who attended from 1991 to 1998
 Ruth L. Saw, Professor of Aesthetics from 1961 to 1964 at Birkbeck College, and President from 1969 to 1970 of the British Society of Aesthetics, and from 1965 to 1966 of the Aristotelian Society
 Prof. Margaret Scott-Wright, Professor of Nursing Studies from 1972 to 1976 at the University of Edinburgh – the UK's first professor of nursing
 Joanna Taylor, actress who played Geri Hudson in Hollyoaks in the late 1990s, now married to footballer Danny Murphy

References

External links

 Wallington High
 Springfield Church
 Pictures of former school site
 EduBase

Girls' schools in London
Educational institutions established in 1888
Academies in the London Borough of Sutton
Grammar schools in the London Borough of Sutton
1888 establishments in England
Specialist language colleges in England